The term Orthodoxy in America or Orthodoxy in the Americas may refer to:

 in relation to Orthodox Judaism:
 Orthodox Judaism in the United States of America, representing communities and institutions of Orthodox Judaism in the USA
 Orthodox Judaism in the Americas, representing communities and institutions of Orthodox Judaism in North and South America

 in relation to Eastern Orthodox Christianity:
 Eastern Orthodoxy in the United States of America, representing communities and institutions of Eastern Orthodox Christianity in the USA
 Eastern Orthodoxy in North America, representing communities and institutions of Eastern Orthodox Christianity in North America
 Eastern Orthodoxy in South America, representing communities and institutions of Eastern Orthodox Christianity in South America

 in relation to Oriental Orthodox Christianity:
 Oriental Orthodoxy in the United States of America, representing communities and institutions of Oriental Orthodox Christianity in the USA
 Oriental Orthodoxy in North America, representing communities and institutions of Oriental Orthodox Christianity in North America
 Oriental Orthodoxy in South America, representing communities and institutions of Oriental Orthodox Christianity in South America

 any other form of orthodoxy in America (political, ideological, social, economic, scientific, artistic)

See also
 Orthodoxy (disambiguation)
 America (disambiguation)
 Orthodox Church (disambiguation)
 Orthodox Church in America (disambiguation)